Ursula M. Burns (born September 20, 1958) is an American businesswoman. Burns is mostly known for being the CEO of Xerox from 2009 to 2016, the first among black women to be a CEO of a Fortune 500 company, and the first woman to succeed another as head of a Fortune 500 company. She additionally was Xerox's chairman from 2010 to 2017.

Burns is also known for serving on the board of directors on multiple large American companies, including Uber, American Express, and ExxonMobil. She was the chairman and CEO of VEON from late 2018 to early 2020, and the Chairwoman of Teneo.

In 2014, Forbes rated her the 22nd most powerful woman in the world. Among other civic positions, she was a leader of the STEM program of the White House from 2009 to 2016, and head of the President's Export Council from 2015 until 2016.

Early life and education
Burns was raised by a single mother in the Baruch Houses, a New York city housing project. Both of her parents were Panamanian immigrants. She attended Cathedral High School, a Catholic all-girls school on East 56th Street in New York. She went on to obtain a bachelor of science degree in mechanical engineering from Brooklyn Polytechnic Institute (now New York University Tandon School of Engineering) in 1980 and a master of science in mechanical engineering from Columbia University a year later. She has since received additional honorary degrees from New York University, Williams College, the University of Pennsylvania, Howard University, Rensselaer Polytechnic Institute, The City College of New York, Rochester Institute of Technology (RIT), the University of Rochester, Xavier University, and Georgetown University.

Business career

Xerox
Burns first worked for Xerox as a summer intern in 1980, and permanently joined a year later, after completing her master's degree. She worked in various roles in product development and planning at the company for the remainder of the 1980s. In January 1990, her career took an unexpected turn when Wayland Hicks, then a senior executive, offered Burns a job as his executive assistant. She accepted and worked for him for roughly nine months before returning home because she was about to marry. In June 1991, she then became executive assistant to then chairman and chief executive Paul Allaire. In 1999, she was named vice president for global manufacturing. In May 2000, Burns was named senior vice president of corporate strategic services and began working closely with soon-to-be CEO Anne Mulcahy, in what both women have described as a true partnership.  Two years later, Burns became president of business group operations.

In 2007, Burns assumed the role of president of Xerox. In July 2009 she was named CEO, succeeding Mulcahy, who remained as chairwoman until May 2010. The first black woman CEO to head a Fortune 500 company, Burns was also the first woman to succeed another woman as head of a Fortune 500 company. Shortly after being named CEO, Burns led the acquisition of Affiliated Computer Services. While as CEO, Burns was named an International Fellow of the Royal Academy of Engineering in 2013. In 2016, she led Xerox in a split into two independent companies: Xerox Corporation and Conduent Incorporated. She remained chairwoman and CEO of Xerox through the process, and was then appointed chairwoman of the standalone document technology company. After stepping down from the position in December 2016, Burns was succeeded by Jeff Jacobson. She retained the title of chairwoman of the newly formed document technology company until May 2017, when she left the Xerox board and her role as chairperson.

Public service roles
U.S. President Barack Obama appointed Burns to help lead the White House National STEM program in 2009, and she remained a leader of the STEM program until 2016. In March 2010 President Obama appointed Burns as vice chair of the President's Export Council, which she led from 2015 to 2016.

Board roles
Burns has served on numerous boards, including those of Boston Scientific, FIRST, the National Association of Manufacturers, the University of Rochester, the MIT Corporation, the Rochester Business Alliance, and the RUMP Group. She remains a board director of the American Express Corporation, Exxon Mobil Corporation, Datto Inc., and Nestlé. In July 2017, it was announced that she would join the board of the beverage company Diageo on April 2, 2018. She joined Teneo as a senior advisor in June 2017. Burns joined the board of directors of Uber in late September 2017. In 2020, she was appointed to the board of directors of Waystar.

Veon
In July 2017, Burns was elected chairman of VEON, the world's 11th largest telecoms service provider by subscribers, by its board of directors. With the sudden departure of the CEO in March 2018, she was made executive chairwoman pending a selection process, and in December 2018, she was appointed as CEO.

In February 2020, Kaan Terzioğlu and Sergi Herrero were appointed co-CEOs, succeeding Burns. In June 2020, Gennady Gazin succeeded Burns as chairman.

Diageo 
Burns was announced to be joining Diageo board as a non executive director but Diageo  announced on March 2018, that "Burns will not take up her appointment as Non-Executive Director on the Diageo Board" as she has been appointed as interim Executive Chairman of VEON

Community activities
Burns provides leadership counsel to community, educational and non-profit organizations including FIRST (For Inspiration and Recognition of Science and Technology), National Academy Foundation, MIT, and the U.S. Olympic Committee, among others. She is a founding board director of Change the Equation, which focuses on improving the U.S.'s education system in science, technology, engineering and math (STEM). She served as vice chairwoman of the executive committee of The Business Council between 2013 and 2014. She has delivered the commencement address at universities including Rochester Institute of Technology, MIT, the University of Rochester, Xavier University, Howard University, Williams College, and Georgetown University.

She has been listed multiple times by Forbes as one of the 100 most powerful women in the world. In 2015, she was listed as the 29th.  In 2018 she was featured among "America's Top 50 Women In Tech".

In 2016 hacked emails revealed she was on a list of potential candidates for vice president for Hillary Clinton.

Personal life
Burns was married to Lloyd Bean until his death in 2019; he also worked at Xerox, and they lived in Rochester, New York. She has a daughter Melissa (born c. 1992) and a stepson Malcolm (born c. 1989) who attended MIT. Burns has been a major donor to McQuaid Jesuit High School in New York.

Memoir
Burns published a memoir, Where You Are Is Not Who You Are: A Memoir, in 2021.

See also 
 List of International Fellows of the Royal Academy of Engineering

References

Further reading

External links
 "Ursula M. Burns", Black Entrepreneur Profile Website
 Ursula Burns  Video produced by Makers: Women Who Make America
 

|-

|-

1958 births
American people of Panamanian descent
American technology chief executives
Columbia School of Engineering and Applied Science alumni
Directors of Xerox
Living people
People from the Lower East Side
American chief executives of Fortune 500 companies
African-American women engineers
African-American engineers
Xerox people
American women business executives
American women chief executives
Directors of ExxonMobil
Businesspeople from New York City
Polytechnic Institute of New York University alumni
20th-century American businesspeople
20th-century American businesswomen
21st-century American businesspeople
21st-century American businesswomen
American chairpersons of corporations
American corporate directors
Women corporate directors
American mechanical engineers
Engineers from New York (state)
American women engineers
Directors of Uber
Fellows of the Royal Academy of Engineering
Female Fellows of the Royal Academy of Engineering
Boston Scientific people